Trent Klasna (born December 9, 1969) is an American former professional road bicycle racer. He comes from Lantana, Florida and rode professionally from 1994 to 2004.

Major results

1996
 1st Stage 2 Redlands Bicycle Classic
1997
 2nd Overall Herald Sun Tour
 2nd First Union Invitational
 3rd Overall Tour de Beauce
1998
 1st Overall Sea Otter Classic
 1st Overall Valley of the Sun Stage Race 
1st Stage 2
 1st Stage 5 Redlands Bicycle Classic
 2nd Overall Fitchburg Longsjo Classic
 9th First Union Invitational
1999
 1st Overall 
1st Stages 1, 2 & 3
 1st Stage 2 Tour de Toona
2000
 1st First Union Invitational
 1st Stage 4 Solano Bicycle Classic
 2nd Nevada City Classic
 3rd Overall Redlands Bicycle Classic
1st Stages 3 & 5
 3rd Athens Twilight Criterium
 3rd Bonsall-San Luis Rey Classic
2001
 1st Overall USA Cycling National Racing Calendar
 National Road Championships
1st  Time trial
2nd Road race
 1st Overall Redlands Bicycle Classic
1st Stage 4 Redlands Bicycle Classic
 1st Overall Sea Otter Classic
 1st Stage 6b Tour de Beauce
 2nd Athens Twilight Criterium
 3rd Overall Solano Bicycle Classic
 3rd First Union Invitational
 3rd San Francisco Grand Prix
 5th First Union Classic
2002
2003
 1st Overall Nature Valley Grand Prix (USA)
1st Stage 5
2004
 1st Stage 1 Sea Otter Classic

References 

Interview

1969 births
Living people
American male cyclists
People from Lantana, Florida